The AN/ALE-50 towed decoy system is an electronic countermeasure tool designed by Raytheon to protect multiple US military aircraft from air-to-air and surface-to-air radar-guided missiles. The AN/ALE-50 towed decoy system is an anti-missile countermeasures decoy system used on U.S. Air Force, Navy, and Marine Corps aircraft, and by certain non-United States air forces. The system is manufactured by Raytheon Space and Airborne Systems at its facility in Goleta, California. The ALE-50 system consists of a launcher and launch controller installed on the aircraft (usually on a wing pylon), and one or more expendable towed decoys. Each decoy is delivered in a sealed canister and has a ten-year shelf life.  

When deployed, the decoy is towed behind the host aircraft, protecting the aircraft and its crew against RF-guided missiles by luring the missile toward the decoy and away from the intended target. In both flight tests and actual combat, the ALE-50 has successfully countered numerous live firings of both surface-to-air and air-to-air missiles. U.S. military pilots have nicknamed the decoy "Little Buddy". The system requires no threat-specific software, and communicates its health and status to the aircraft over a standard data bus.

Operational history 
The ALE-50 was first deployed in 1995, but is also used on the F/A-18E/F Super Hornet and the B-1B Lancer. The ALE-50 has also been integrated into the next-generation ALQ-184(V)9 ECM pod, creating an integrated threat-protection system that can be carried on a larger number of platforms.

The ALE-50 expendable decoys' estimated value is $22,000 each.  A production run of 1,048 units were delivered through October 2010. An additional 226 units of ALE-50 Bravo T3F launchers were produced for U.S. Navy F/A-18 E/F aircraft in September 2014.

The ALE-50 towed decoy is currently operational on the F-16, F/A-18E/F, and B-1B aircraft with more than 25,000 deliveries.

References 

Electronic countermeasures
Electronic warfare equipment
Military electronics of the United States
Equipment of the United States Air Force
Military technology
Raytheon Company products
Towed decoys
Weapons countermeasures
Military equipment introduced in the 1990s